Diplostephium ramiglabrum is a species of flowering plant in the family Asteraceae. Its natural habitat is subtropical or tropical moist montane forests. It is threatened by habitat loss.

References

ramiglabrum
Flora of Ecuador
Endangered plants
Taxonomy articles created by Polbot